Chipev Nunatak (‘Chipev Nunatak’ \'chi-pev 'nu-na-tak\) is the narrow, rocky hill extending 2.9 km in north-south direction and rising to 850 m on the east side of Edgeworth Glacier on Nordenskjöld Coast in Graham Land, Antarctica.

The nunatak is named after Nesho Chipev (b. 1953), biologist at St. Kliment Ohridski base during the 1994/95 and subsequent seasons.

Location

Map
 Antarctic Digital Database (ADD). Scale 1:250000 topographic map of Antarctica. Scientific Committee on Antarctic Research (SCAR), 1993–2016.

Notes

References
 Chipev Nunatak. SCAR Composite Antarctic Gazetteer.
 Bulgarian Antarctic Gazetteer. Antarctic Place-names Commission. (details in Bulgarian, basic data in English)

External links
 Chipev Nunatak. Adjusted Copernix satellite image

Nunataks of Graham Land
Bulgaria and the Antarctic
Nordenskjöld Coast